Casimir Johannes Ludwig Otto Prince zu Sayn-Wittgenstein-Berleburg (22 January 1917 – 21 February 2010) was a German nobleman, businessman and politician from the Christian Democratic Union. He was Member of the European Parliament from 1979 to 1983.

Political career 
Sayn-Wittgenstein-Berleburg was CDU treasurer during the CDU donations scandal.

Family 

References

See also 

 List of members of the European Parliament (1979–1984)
 List of members of the European Parliament for West Germany, 1979–1984

1917 births
2010 deaths
House of Sayn-Wittgenstein

20th-century German politicians
Christian Democratic Union of Germany politicians
Christian Democratic Union of Germany MEPs
MEPs for Germany 1979–1984